Narayan is a municipality located in Dailekh District of Karnali Province of Nepal.

The municipality is divided into total 11 wards.

The municipality was established on 26 March 1997 merging the then Village development committees of Narayan, Belaspur, Saraswati, Tribhuvan and Basantamala.

On 10 March 2017 Government of Nepal restricted old administrative structure and announced 744 local level units (although the number increased to 753 later) as per the new constitution of Nepal 2015. Thus, on 10 March 2017, Bhawani, Bindhyabasini and Kharigaira Village development committees were incorporated with former municipality. The headquarters of the municipality is situated at Dailekh

Demographics
At the time of the 2011 Nepal census, 96.3% of the population in Narayan Municipality spoke Nepali, 3.3% Magar, 0.2% Maithili and 0.1% Tharu as their first language; 0.1% spoke other languages.

In terms of ethnicity/caste, 39.2% were Chhetri, 13.4% Kami, 11.4% Hill Brahmin, 10.6% Magar, 7.8% Thakuri, 7.1% Sarki, 4.6% Damai/Dholi, 2.6% Newar, 1.3% Gurung and 2.0% others.

In terms of religion, 97.7% were Hindu, 1.9% Christian, 0.3% Buddhist and 0.1% Muslim.

References

External links
 https://www.narayannepal.com.np
 http://www.narayanmun.gov.np/
 https://www.citypopulation.de/php/nepal-mun-admin.php?adm2id=6009

Populated places in Dailekh District
Municipalities in Karnali Province
Nepal municipalities established in 1997